Boikiy is a  corvette of the Russian Navy, the third ship of that class. She was laid down in July 2005 and was launched on 15 April 2011. She was presented to the Baltic Fleet for final inspection by the Navy on 16 March 2012 ahead of her commissioning later in the year. On 16 November 2012 it was reported that the corvette had already passed the shipyard's sea trials; about 70 certificates were signed then. JSC Arsenal intended to produce a 100-mm gun mount A190-01 for the corvette, and late in 2012 the ship moved to Baltiysk acceptance base for the second phase of sea trials. This began state acceptance trials.

The corvette was handed over to the Russian navy on 14 May 2013.

In April 2017, Boikiy and sister Soobrazitelnyy were escorted through the English Channel by HMS Sutherland.

On 20 March 2021, Boikiy, accompanied by LSTs Korolyov, Minsk and Kaliningrad transited the English Channel unannounced. The significance of the deployment is in the lack of the public announcement of the exit to sea by the Baltic Fleet, as well as strong amphibious component of the ship detachment. The deployment could have simulated keeping the sea lines of communication between Baltic and Black Sea Fleet open in a wartime scenario. The four-ship detachment then separated: Kaliningrad and Korolyov entered the Mediterranean Sea on 25 March, while Boikiy and Minsk returned to the Baltic Sea on 27 March.

On 22 March, the three LSTs of the Baltic Fleet were joined by additional two LSTs of the Northern Fleet: Aleksandr Otrakovskiy and Kondoponga, escorted by tug SB-406 Vikhr.

References

Steregushchiy-class corvettes
2011 ships
Ships built at Severnaya Verf